Heenweg is a town in the Dutch province of South Holland. It is a part of the municipality of Westland, and lies about 7 km northwest of Maassluis.

In 2001, the town of Heenweg had 601 inhabitants. The built-up area of the town was 0.076 km², and contained 228 residences.
The statistical area "Heenweg", which also can include the peripheral parts of the village, as well as the surrounding countryside, has a population of around 690.

References

Populated places in South Holland
Westland (municipality), Netherlands